Anthony or Tony Carter may refer to:

Sports

American football
Anthony Carter (American football) (born 1960), wide receiver
Tony Carter (running back) (born 1972), American football player
Tony Carter (cornerback) (born 1986), American football player

Other sports
Tony Carter (footballer) (1881–1970), English full back
Anthony Carter (basketball) (born 1975), American point guard and coach
Anthony Carter (baseball) (born 1986), American pitcher
Anthony Carter (soccer, born 1994), Australian association football player

Fictional characters
Anthony Lloyd Carter, death row convict in Justin Cronin's The Passage (2010)
Anthony Carter, also known as Anthony Rester, crime scene investigator in the 2003–2006 manga series Death Note